The 2018 Italian local elections were held on different dates; most on  10 June, with a second round on 24 June. In Italy, direct elections were held in 720 municipalities: in each comune were chosen mayor and members of the City Council. Of the 783 municipalities, 21 were provincial capitala and only 112 had a population higher than 15,000 inhabitants (10,000 for Sicily).

In Friuli-Venezia Giulia the elections were held on 29 April with a second ballot on 13 May; while in Aosta Valley they were held on 20 May, and in Trentino Alto-Adige on 27 May.

Voting System
All mayoral elections in Italy in cities with a population higher than 15,000 use the same voting system. Under this system voters express a direct choice for the mayor or an indirect choice voting for the party of the candidate's coalition. If no candidate receives at least 50% of votes, the top two candidates go to a second round after two weeks. This gives a result whereby the winning candidate may be able to claim majority support, although it is not guaranteed.

The election of the City Council is based on a direct choice for the candidate with a preference vote: the candidate with the majority of the preferences is elected. The number of the seats for each party is determined proportionally.

Municipal elections

Overall results 
Majority of each coalition in the 112 municipalities (comuni) with a population higher than 15,000:

By party 
Party results in the main municipalities:

Mayoral election results

References

2018 elections in Italy
 
 
Municipal elections in Italy
April 2018 events in Italy
May 2018 events in Italy
June 2018 events in Italy